Entanet International Limited, more commonly known as merely Entanet, and frequently stylised as Enta.net, is a leading British wholesale internet service provider (ISP), with its head office in Telford, Shropshire, England. Entanet International Limited is a member of the Internet Service Providers Association (ISPA).

History
Entanet was formed as a limited company in November 1996.  Its founder and first chief executive officer (CEO) was Jason Tsai, who was awarded the title of Channel Entrepreneur of the Year by the Comms Business Awards in 2010.

In 2014, Mobeus Equity Partners made an initial £6 million investment to support a £14 million management buyout.

In July 2017, Entanet was acquired by CityFibre for £29 million.

Awards
Entanet has won a number of industry and marketing awards, including in 2018, the Comms Business Channel Supplier: Connectivity, and the Internet Service Providers Association (ISPA) Awards Best Wholesale ISP.

Notes and references

External links
Wholesale.CityFibre.com — official website

Internet service providers of the United Kingdom
Telecommunications companies of the United Kingdom
VoIP services
Companies based in Shropshire
Telecommunications companies established in 1996
1996 establishments in England